is a 2006 Japanese historical TV drama based on the 16th-century Chinese novel Journey to the West. It is a successor to the popular 1970s TV show Saiyūki, known outside Japan as Monkey. There have been three dramas and one special based on Journey to the West that have aired previously, making this one the fifth adaptation in Japan.

Fuji TV made an unusual decision to air this on 9pm every Monday, a primetime slot usually reserved for romantic dramas, hoping to capture both the young and the old by making this choice. While the series started off with viewership nearly reaching 30%, its rating gradually sank, barely making it at 20% at one point; the last episode finished off with 24.7%.

Rather than producing a second season, Fuji TV and Toho produced a feature film version of Saiyūki, that was released in Japan on July 14, 2007. The film was a box office success, becoming the 8th highest-grossing film of 2007 in Japan. The whole plot of the film is loosely based on chapters 32-35 of Journey to the West, Son Gokū trying to save a kingdom (with the help of a young princess) usurped by King Gold Horn and Silver Horn. The DVD was released on January 1, 2008, in two formats: a single disc version with audio commentary and trailers, and a 2-Disc limited collector's edition with documentaries and making-of featurettes; it has also been released to both DVD and Blu-ray Disc in the United Kingdom, under the title Monkey Magic: The Movie.

Cast
Son Gokū - Shingo Katori
Sanzōhōshi - Eri Fukatsu
Cho Hakkai - Atsushi Itō
Sha Gojō - Teruyoshi Uchimura
 Princess Rin Rin - Asami Mizukawa

Notable guests
Kadono Takuzo
Takuya Kimura
Rieko Miura
Keiji Mutoh
Hitomi Takahashi 
Shaku Yumiko
Ayumi Ishida
Masaaki Sakai—Portrayed Son Goku in the original Monkey TV series, appeared here as Buddha.

List of episodes

Soundtrack 
Selected pieces of score from the series, as composed by Satoshi Takebe, were released on 1 March 2006 by Avex Trax

The Original Soundtrack to the film, also composed by Satoshi Takebe, was released on 1 August 2007 by Rhythm Zone

See also
Saiyuki
Patalliro Saiyuki!

References

External links
Saiyūki at J-dorama.com
The 2006 series on IMDb
The 2007 film on IMDb

2006 Japanese television series debuts
2006 Japanese television series endings
Japanese drama television series
Television shows based on Journey to the West
Television shows written by Yûji Sakamoto
Fuji TV dramas